The long-tailed ghost pipefish  or armored ghost pipefish (Solenostomus armatus) is a ghost pipefish in the family Solenostomidae. The species name comes from the Greek armatura, referring to this fish's armor of dermal plates. Solenostomus leptosoma is now considered a synonym of S. armatus, the valid species identification.

Physical appearance
S. armatus reaches a maximum length of 5.7 cm (standard length) and vary in color from dark red to beige. Compared to other ghost pipefishes, they possess an elongated caudal tail and peduncle, as indicated by their common name.

Biology
The long-tailed ghost pipefish is a tropical marine species, found over muddy bottoms near reefs in the western Pacific Ocean. Like all ghost pipefish, females carry the eggs in pelvic fins that become modified to form a brood pouch.

Conservation status
The IUCN conservation status of S. armatus has not been assessed.

References

Further reading
Kuiter, RH. 2000. Seahorses, pipefishes, and their relatives: a comprehensive guide to Syngnathiformes. TMC Publishing. 240p.

Solenostomus
Fish of the Pacific Ocean
Fish of Japan
Fish described in 1913
Taxa named by Max Carl Wilhelm Weber